Valentino Valentini (died 1593) was a Roman Catholic prelate who served as Bishop of Città Ducale (1580–1593).

Biography
On 14 November 1580, Valentino Valentini was appointed during the papacy of Pope Gregory XIII as Bishop of Città Ducale.
He served as Bishop of Città Ducale until his death in 1593.

References

External links and additional sources
 (for Chronology of Bishops) 
 (for Chronology of Bishops) 

16th-century Italian Roman Catholic bishops
Bishops appointed by Pope Gregory XIII
1593 deaths